Kunnathukal is a village in Perumkadavila Block Panchayat, of Thiruvananthapuram district in the Indian state of Kerala.It located a 30 km away from Trivandrum city. It shares the border of Tamil Nadu state in its south east region. The holy Major Chezhunganoor Mahadeva Temple is located in this village.The famous chimmindi temple also belonging to this panchayat

Politics
The panchayat of Kunnathukal

References
http://www.lsgkerala.in/kunnathukalpanchayat

Villages in Thiruvananthapuram district

bpy:নেয্যত্তিকর